Posipal is a surname. Notable people with the surname include:
 Josef Posipal (1927–1997), German footballer
 Patrick Posipal (born 1988), German footballer, son of Peer
 Peer Posipal (born 1962), German footballer, son of Josef